Robert Cruickshank may refer to:

 Bobby Cruickshank (1894–1975), Scottish golfer
 Robert Edward Cruickshank (1888–1961), Canadian Victoria Cross recipient
 Robert Cruickshank (sailor) (born 1963), British sailor
 Robert Cruickshank (Australian politician) (1878–1928)
 Robert Cruickshank (bacteriologist) (1899–1974)